Bifunctional aminoacyl-tRNA synthetase is an enzyme that in humans is encoded by the EPRS gene.

Gene 

Alternative splicing has been observed for this gene, but the full-length nature and biological validity of the variant have not been determined.

Function 

Aminoacyl-tRNA synthetases are a class of enzymes that charge tRNAs with their cognate amino acids. The protein encoded by this gene is a multifunctional aminoacyl-tRNA synthetase that catalyzes the aminoacylation of glutamic acid and proline tRNA species.

Phosphorylation of EPRS is reported to be essential for the formation of GAIT (Gamma-interferon Activated Inhibitor of Translation) complex that regulates the translation of multiple genes in monocytes and macrophages.

Interactions 

EPRS has been shown to interact with POU2F1, Heat shock protein 90kDa alpha (cytosolic), member A1 and IARS.

References

Further reading